Trail City is an unincorporated community in Corson County, South Dakota, United States. Although not tracked by the Census Bureau, Trail City has been assigned the ZIP code of 57657.

The community was named for a cattle drive trail near the original town site.

References

Unincorporated communities in Corson County, South Dakota
Unincorporated communities in South Dakota